USS Malay (SP-735) was a United States Navy patrol vessel in commission from 1917 to 1919.

Malay was built as a private steam yacht of the same name in 1898 by Delaware River Iron Ship Building and Engine Works at Chester, Pennsylvania. On 28 April 1917, the U.S. Navy acquired her under a free lease from her owner, Hannah P. Weld of Boston, Massachusetts, for use as a section patrol vessel during World War I. She was commissioned as USS Malay (SP-735) on 16 June 1917.

Malay patrolled waters along the United States East Coast for the rest of World War I.

On 1 March 1919, the Navy returned Malay to Weld, who sold her to a buyer from Honduras in 1921.

References

Department of the Navy Naval History and Heritage Command Online Library of Selected Images: Civilian Ships: Malay (Steam Yacht, 1898); Later USS Malay (SP-735), 1917-1919
NavSource Online: Section Patrol Craft Photo Archive Malay (SP 735)

Patrol vessels of the United States Navy
Ships built by the Delaware River Iron Ship Building and Engine Works
World War I patrol vessels of the United States
1898 ships
Individual yachts